Born Again is the sixth album by American composer Randy Newman. The album was released on August 18, 1979, to little sales and relatively poor reviews, which surprised Newman. Newman went on to say that Born Again was the strangest album that he had ever done. The album cover features Randy Newman in a business office, wearing white and black face makeup (an obvious parody of Kiss), with dollar signs painted over his eyes. This was poking fun at the commercialization of rock music.

Release
Newman expected the album to be a hit. Instead, the album sold relatively poorly, with worse reviews than its predecessor. Stephen Holden, writing for Rolling Stone, criticized the album for its "snide" and "nihilistic" tone. Newman called it "a larger insult," and reflected, "The mistake I made was that to do this, people have to know who you are in the first place."   "It's a weird album full of peculiar songs like the one about an ELO fan getting everything wrong. It's very idiosyncratic, with small subjects. If it had been a hit to follow it might have been different but I have always written the same way." Ironically, Jeff Lynne would later be among the producers of Land of Dreams.

Track listing
All tracks written and arranged by Randy Newman.

 "It's Money That I Love" – 3:38
 "The Story of a Rock and Roll Band" – 2:53
 "Pretty Boy" – 4:00
 "Mr. Sheep" – 3:53
 "Ghosts" – 2:28
 "They Just Got Married" – 2:51
 "Spies" – 3:55
 "The Girls in My Life (Part One)" – 2:36
 "Half a Man" – 3:38
 "William Brown" – 1:50
 "Pants" – 3:06

Charts

Personnel
 Randy Newman – vocals, piano, Fender Rhodes
 Waddy Wachtel, Buzz Feiten – guitar
 Chuck Findley, Tom Scott – horns
 Victor Feldman – piano, Fender Rhodes, drums, percussion
 Michael Boddicker – synthesizer
 David Shields, Willie Weeks – bass guitar 
 Andy Newmark – drums
 Lenny Castro, Carlos Vega – percussion
 Stephen Bishop – background vocals
 Valerie Carter – background vocals
 Arno Lucas – background vocals
Technical
Tom Knox – engineer
Lee Herschberg – mixing
Mike Salisbury – art direction, cover design
Mark Feldman – cover photography

References

1979 albums
Randy Newman albums
Albums produced by Lenny Waronker
Albums produced by Russ Titelman
Warner Records albums
Avant-pop albums
Albums arranged by Randy Newman
Albums conducted by Randy Newman